Christopher Sean Verhulst (born May 16, 1966) is a former professional American football player who played tight end for the Houston Oilers and the Denver Broncos. He was drafted by the Oilers in the 5th round (130th overall) in the 1988 NFL Draft.

1966 births
Living people
Players of American football from Sacramento, California
American football tight ends
Chico State Wildcats football players
Houston Oilers players
Denver Broncos players